Austin Township is the name of some places in the U.S. state of Michigan:
Austin Township, Mecosta County, Michigan
Austin Township, Sanilac County, Michigan

See also 
 Port Austin Township, Michigan in Huron County
 Austin, Michigan (disambiguation)
 Austin Township (disambiguation)

Michigan township disambiguation pages